Mark Aldanov (Mordkhai-Markus Israelevich Landau, Mark Alexandrovich Landau, ;  – February 25, 1957) was a Russian Empire and later French writer and critic, known for his historical novels.

Aldanov's first book about Vladimir Lenin, translated into several languages, immediately gained him popularity. Then followed a trilogy of novels attempting to trace the roots of the Russian Revolution. He also wrote a tetralogy of novels about Napoleonic wars. All in all, he published 16 larger literary works and a great number of articles and essays. He was nominated for the  Nobel Prize in Literature thirteen times.

Biography
Mordkhai-Markus Landau (Aldanov) was born in Kiev in the family of a rich Jewish industrialist. He graduated the physical-mathematical and law departments of Kiev University. He published serious research papers in chemistry. In 1919 he emigrated to France. During 1922-1924 he lived in Berlin and during 1941-1946, in the United States.

Ivan Bunin, the first Russian writer to win the Nobel Prize for Literature, nominated Aldanov for Nobel Prize a total of six times - in 1938, 1939, 1947, 1948, 1949, and 1950.

Mark Aldanov died in Nice, France. His extensive correspondence with Vladimir Nabokov, Ivan Bunin, Alexander Kerensky and other emigre celebrities was published posthumously.

Novy Zhurnal
In 1942, while in New York, Aldanov cofounded Novy Zhurnal (The New Review; Russian: Новый журнал) together with his colleague and friend Mikhail Tsetlin. Until November 1945 they both served as Editors-in-Chief of this publication, which is considered the oldest Russian language literary periodical in print published outside of Russia. Among the review's contributors were Vladimir Nabokov, Ivan Bunin, Joseph Brodsky, Aleksandr Solzhenitsyn, and other notable Russian emigre writers.

The Aldanov Literary Prize

Since 2007 Novy Zhurnal has been awarding The Aldanov Literary Prize conferred for the best novella or novellete authored by a Russian-language writer living outside or Russia.

Bibliography

The Thinker, a tetralogy
The Ninth Thermidor
The Devil's Bridge
The Conspiracy
St. Helena: Little Island

Novels
Punch Vodka
The Ninth Thermidor
The Devil's Bridge
Conspiracy
The Tenth Symphony
Saint Helena, Little Island
For Thee the Best
A Story About Death
Before the Deluge
Suicide
The Key
Escape
The Cave
The Fifth Seal - Тhe Beginning of the End
Live As You Please
Nightmare and Dawn
Moltke the Younger
Querétaro and Emperor Maximilian

References

1886 births
1957 deaths
Writers from Kyiv
People from Kievsky Uyezd
White Russian emigrants to France
Popular Socialists (Russia)
Novelists from the Russian Empire
Biographers from the Russian Empire
Male biographers
Essayists from the Russian Empire
Literary critics from the Russian Empire
20th-century novelists
20th-century essayists
Jews from the Russian Empire
20th-century Russian male writers
Taras Shevchenko National University of Kyiv alumni
20th-century pseudonymous writers